Gyula Pap (1813–1870) was an ethnographer and writer of Hungarian folk tales, most notably The Folk-Tales of the Magyars.

External links
 
 

1813 births
1870 deaths